Islington London Borough Council in London, England is elected every four years. Since the last boundary changes in 2002, 48 councillors have been elected from 16 wards.

Political control
Since the first election to the council in 1964 political control of the council has been held by the following parties:

Leadership
The leaders of the council since 1965 have been:

Council elections
 1964 Islington London Borough Council election
 1968 Islington London Borough Council election
 1971 Islington London Borough Council election
 1974 Islington London Borough Council election
 1978 Islington London Borough Council election (boundary changes reduced the number of seats by eight)
 1982 Islington London Borough Council election
 1986 Islington London Borough Council election
 1990 Islington London Borough Council election
 1994 Islington London Borough Council election (boundary changes took place but the number of seats remained the same)
 1998 Islington London Borough Council election
 2002 Islington London Borough Council election (boundary changes reduced the number of seats by four) 
 2006 Islington London Borough Council election
 2010 Islington London Borough Council election
 2014 Islington London Borough Council election
 2018 Islington London Borough Council election
 2022 Islington London Borough Council election (boundary changes increased the number of seats by three)

Borough result maps

By-election results

1964-1968
There were no by-elections.

1968-1971
There were no by-elections.

1971-1974

1974-1978

1978-1982

1982-1986

1986-1990

1990-1994

The by-election was called following the resignation of Cllr. David L. Yorath.

The by-election was called following the death of Cllr. Paul A. Matthews.

The by-election was called following the resignation of Cllr. Candy Atherton.

The by-election was called following the resignation of Cllr. Jane Mackay.

The by-election was called following the resignation of Cllr. Christopher M. B. King.

The by-election was called following the resignation of Cllr. Chris Adamson.

1994-1998

The by-election was called following the resignation of Cllr. James M. D. Purnell.

The by-election was called following the resignation of Cllr. Michael Tal. 

The by-election was called following the resignation of Cllr. Stephen Twigg.

1998-2002

The by-election was called following the resignation of Cllr. Sarah A. Ludford.

The by-election was called following the death of Cllr. Milton K. Babulall.

The by-election was called following the resignation of Cllr. Sandra Marks.

2002-2006

The by-election was called following the death of Cllr. Rosetta E. Wooding.

The by-election was called following the resignation of Cllr. Ian G. Powney.

The by-election was called following the resignation of Cllr. Paul Fox.

The by-election was called following the resignation of Cllr. Sarah Teather.

The by-election was called following the resignation of Cllr. Mary H. Creagh.

2006-2010
There were no by-elections.

2010-2014

The by-election was called following the resignation of Cllr. Ms. Michelle M. Coupland.

The by-election was called following the disqualification of Cllr. Ms. Joan Coupland.

The by-election was called following the resignation of Cllr. Ms. Lucy C. M. Rigby.

The by-election was called following the resignation of Cllr. Arthur T. Graves.

The by-election was called following the resignation of Cllr. Ms. Jessica Asato.

2014-2018

The by-election was called following the resignation of James Murray.

References

By-election results

External links
Islington Council